The Colt OHWS (also known as Colt SOCOM) was a semi-automatic pistol created by Colt to compete for the United States Special Operations Command (US SOCOM) Offensive Handgun Weapon System (OHWS) tender. The winner of this competition would become the standard-issue handgun for most US special forces groups. The OHWS contract was awarded to Heckler & Koch for their MK23 Mod 0 pistol, and Colt scrapped the project.

The Colt OHWS was based on the M1911 frame and carried a single-stack 10-round magazine. The handgun was designed to carry a removable sound suppressor and a laser aiming module (LAM).

The handgun was chambered for the .45 ACP cartridge.

Colt developed their OHWS handgun during the early 1990s to compete for a contract under the US SOCOM Offensive Handgun Weapon System (OHWS) program. The Colt OHWS was produced to fire .45 ammunition, but was capable of firing most .45 ammunition designed, including SOCOMs intended primary round .45 ACP + P. At the time Colt's pistols were not capable of handling +P ammunition consistently, Colt decided that instead of modifying the previous SOCOM weapon the M1911A1 to meet SOCOMs current needs it would be more cost-effective to produce a brand new handgun.
	The Colt OHWS was a compilation of combined top features from other Colt firearms including the M1911A1, Double Eagle and All American 2000. Colt used the rotating barrel locking system from the All American 2000 – one of the strongest locking systems designed for handguns; a double-action trigger with de-cocker, and hammer from the Double Eagle; and the manual safety, and firing mechanism from the M1911A1, though adjustable and produced much less recoil. The design was modified from the M1911A1, except mostly machined and slide was made of stainless steel. Colt added a slide lock, to stop cycling of the mechanism and slide in sound-sensitive cases. To promote reliability Colt decided to use a single-column 10-round magazine instead of a double-column. An interesting feature of the Colt OHWS was mounting muzzle attachments was done through the frame instead of moving barrel, they did this by adding an extension rail and toggle switch. The problem was the silencer could not be attached without the muzzle brake in proper place. Colt added in an additional rail under the dust cover to attach tactical lights or LAMs. 
	SOCOM found the Colt OHWS to be too bulky, not as durable as expected and the accessories to be too meticulous to use and fit, leading to a loss in the competition for SOCOMs contract to the Heckler & Koch Mark 23.

See also
List of individual weapons of the U.S. Armed Forces

References

External links
Modern Firearms

.45 ACP semi-automatic pistols
Colt semi-automatic pistols
Trial and research firearms of the United States
Semi-automatic pistols of the United States